James Grant (1772 – 11 November 1833) was a Scottish born British Royal Navy officer and navigator in the early nineteenth century. He served in Australia in 1800-1801 and was the first to map parts of the south coast of Australia.

Early life
Grant was baptized on 6 September 1772 at Forres, Morayshire, Scotland. He was educated at King's College, Aberdeen, under Dr. William Chalmers. He entered the Royal Navy as a captain's servant in August 1793 and was appointed a midshipman in May 1794. He passed his board for promotion to lieutenant and was promoted in 1800.

Voyages of exploration
A brig of 60 tons, she carried a crew comprising the commanding officer, two mates and twelve seamen. His instructions were to proceed to Australia to prosecute "the discovery and survey of the unknown parts of the coast of New Holland", although it was always intended that he should hand the ship to Matthew Flinders and take command of HMS Supply. He sailed into Table Cape, South Africa on 8 July 1800. Here Grant received dispatches from the Duke of Portland advising him of the discovery of a strait between New South Wales and Van Diemen's Land. He was to sail through it on his way to Port Jackson, instead of sailing around Van Diemen's Land. Thus his was the first ship to sail through Bass Strait from west to east, charting the then unknown coastline. Lady Nelson entered the heads at Port Jackson at six in the evening of 16 December 1800 after a passage of seventy-one days from Cape Town.

When he arrived, it transpired that Flinders had returned to England and that Supply had been laid up as a hulk at Sydney, and Governor King reappointed him to the Lady Nelson. He was ordered to return to the deep bay which he had sailed across in Bass Strait and make a general survey of the south coast. He left on 6 March 1801, got as far as Western Port where he conducted a survey. He was back at Sydney on 14 May 1801. On 10 June 1801 Grant sailed to the Hunter River conveying Lieutenant Colonel Paterson, to consider the question of a settlement there and the probable extent of the coal deposits.

After a particularly unpleasant period of disagreement with the officers of the New South Wales Corps in Sydney, Grant asked permission on 31 August 1801 to return to Europe, which was granted. King spoke very favourably of Grant's abilities as an officer and seaman, but it is evident that he was not satisfied with Grant's survey work on his voyage to Bass Strait, and Grant was himself conscious of his want of knowledge of nautical surveying. After his return Grant published in 1803 his Narrative of a Voyage of Discovery which was shortly afterwards translated into Dutch and German.

Later work
He reached the rank of commander in January 1805, and was given a pension in 1806 for wounds received in action while in command of hired armed cutter Hawke off the Dutch coast.

Death
He died at Saint-Servan, France, on 11 November 1833.

Legacy

He was the first European to land on Phillip Island and Churchill Island. The south-west point of Phillip Island is named after him. He established a garden on Churchill Island.

Grant in fiction
Grant's early career is the base for a character also named James Grant in Patrick O'Brian's novel Desolation Island, part of the Aubrey–Maturin series. In real life and in the fiction, Grant accomplished much at a young age sailing a sloop to New South Wales (a lieutenant could be captain of a sloop in the Royal Navy of that era) and writing a book about the voyage. In real life he was promoted to Commander; in fiction he is still a lieutenant in 1811, but wanting to be the captain.

See also
Mount Gambier (volcano)
Mount Schank

References

Further reading

Explorers of Australia
Explorers of South Australia
1772 births
1833 deaths
British navigators
Maritime exploration of Australia